The Toro Toro Formation is a Late Campanian geologic formation pertaining to the Puca Group of central Bolivia. The porous yellowish medium-to-coarse grained ferruginous (iron-containing) sandstones and mudstones with gypsum intercalations, deposited in a beach environment, preserve many ichnofossils of Ligabueichnium bolivianum, Dromaeopodus sp., Ornithopoda indet., Theropoda indet. and Titanosauridae indet. The formation has provided the earliest known tracksite of dinosaurs in Bolivia. The Toro Toro Formation represents part of the postrift stage in an alluvial to deltaic environment within the Potosí Basin. The formation is a local equivalent of the Chaunaca Formation. The most famous of the dinosaur tracksites is Cal Orcko, however these are in the El Molino Formation

See also 
 List of fossiliferous stratigraphic units in Bolivia
 List of stratigraphic units with dinosaur tracks
 List of stratigraphic units with theropod tracks
 Cajones Formation
 La Puerta Formation

References

Bibliography 
 
 

Geologic formations of Bolivia
Upper Cretaceous Series of South America
Cretaceous Bolivia
Campanian Stage
Sandstone formations
Mudstone formations
Alluvial deposits
Beach deposits
Deltaic deposits
Paleontology in Bolivia
Formations